Kapkan (also Romanized as Kapkān and Kabkan; also known as Koopkan and Kūpkan) is a village in Miankuh Rural District, Chapeshlu District, Dargaz County, Razavi Khorasan Province, Iran. At the 2006 census, its population was 192, in 64 families.

References 

Populated places in Dargaz County